The Hillen was a Dutch automobile manufactured in Jutphaas sometime around 1913; nothing further is known about the marque.

References

Car manufacturers of the Netherlands
Dutch companies established in 1913
Vehicle manufacturing companies established in 1913